The Niagara Raiders were a Canadian football team in the Canadian Junior Football League's Ontario Football Conference. Formerly the Burlington Braves, the team moved to the Niagara Region for the start of the 2016 season. The Raiders played in St. Catharines, Ontario for four years before announcing on January 8, 2020 that the team had been dissolved.

References

External links
Canadian Junior Football League

Canadian Junior Football League teams
1957 establishments in Ontario
Sports clubs established in 1957
Sport in St. Catharines